Basem Fat'hi Omar Othman (born 1 August 1982) is a retired Jordanian footballer of Palestinian origin who played mostly for Al-Wehdat .

International goals

Honors and Participation in International Tournaments

In AFC Asian Cups
2011 Asian Cup

In WAFF Championships
2007 WAFF Championship
2008 WAFF Championship
2010 WAFF Championship

References
 Basem Fathi: My Injury Has Kept Me From Carrying the Honor of Becoming Captain of the Jordan National Team for the WAFF Championship
 Basem Fathi Signs Up for Al-Shamal

External links 
 
 
 
  

1982 births
Living people
Jordanian footballers
Jordan international footballers
Jordanian people of Palestinian descent
Jordanian expatriate footballers
Jordanian Pro League players
Expatriate footballers in Qatar
Expatriate footballers in Saudi Arabia
Jordanian expatriate sportspeople in Saudi Arabia
Jordanian expatriate sportspeople in Qatar
Al-Wehdat SC players
Al-Watani Club players
Al-Shamal SC players
Shabab Al-Aqaba Club players
Association football defenders
2011 AFC Asian Cup players
Sportspeople from Amman
Saudi Professional League players
Qatari Second Division players